Harry Laidlaw (born 1 March 1996 in Melbourne, Australia) is an alpine skier who will compete  for Australia at the 2018 Winter Olympics in the alpine skiing events.

Career
Laidlaw competed for Australia at the 2012 Winter Youth Olympics in the alpine skiing and competed in four events with his only completed result being 17th in the slalom event.

He competed in his first World Championship in 2017 with him competing in the Super-G but didn't finish his first run.

References

1996 births
Australian male alpine skiers
Alpine skiers at the 2018 Winter Olympics
Olympic alpine skiers of Australia
Alpine skiers at the 2012 Winter Youth Olympics
Freestyle skiers at the 2012 Winter Youth Olympics
Living people
Skiers from Melbourne